Yash Bharati Award is the highest civilian award of the Government of Uttar Pradesh. Instituted in 1994, it is awarded to those personalities whose contribution is remarkable in the field of literature, social work, medicine, film, science, journalism, handicrafts, culture, education, music, drama, sports, industry and astrology.

Yash Bharati Award
These awards were first given in 1994. The winners were given a commendation letter, a shawl and Rs 1 Lakh. In 2005–06, the U.P. Government increased the cash award amount to Rs 5 lakh. The awards were stopped between 1995 and 2003 and again from 2007 to 2012. From the year 2012, the recipient is awarded a commendation letter, a Shawl and Rs 11 Lakh along with a pension Rs. 50,000 per month, on demand. Many eminent persons in the field of Literature, Social work, Handicrafts, Culture, Music, Drama, Sports, Industry, Cinema etc. have been awarded wish Yash Bharti Samman, However, it has, also drawn some flak from media and public for arbitrary distribution and wastage of tax payers money.

The list of awardees

1994
Pradip Mehta: Literature.
Amitabh Bachchan: acting.
Jaya Bachchan: acting.
Baleshwar Yadav.

2006
Abhishek Bachchan: acting.
Viveki Rai: Indian Writer

2007 
 Urmilesh Shankhdhar: Literature.

2013
Rajendra Yadav: Literature
And others

2015
Lodi Mohammad Safi Khan alias 'Bekal Utsahi': Literature
Devi Prasad Pandey "Adig": Literature
Khushbir Singh Shaad: Literature
DR.Gyan Chaturvedi: Literature
DR. Vishnu Saxena: Literature
Hamid Ullah 'Hamid hadee': Literature
Pandit Rajan and Sajan Mishra: Classical Vocal
Anup Jalota: choral singing
Shubha Mudgal: Classical Vocal
Ravindra Jain: Music
Pandit Vikash Maharaj: sarod
Rekha Bhardwaj: light music
Pro. Rita Gaguli: singing Upshastriy
Kailash Kher: singing
Rahat Ali Khan Sabri: Ghazals, Sufi songs and singing
Hira Lal Yadav :Lokgayn
Bansh Gopal Yadav : singing Alhaa 
Vishnu Yadav singing Birha
Pro. Jaikrishna Agarwal: painter
Raj Kumar Varma: Painter, Micro-painting
Krishn Kanhai & Govind Kanhai Gold-painter
Iftakhar Nadime Khan: Wood-Art
DR. Jagdish Gandhi: Education
Pro. Bhagirath Prasad Tripathi 'Wagish Shastri': Education
DR. Kumkum Dhar: Kathak
Geetanjali Sharma: Charkula dance
Sheetala Pandey 'Samir': film lyricist
Yogesh Gaur: Songwriter
DR. Urmil Kumar Thapliyal: Public Theatre
Ashok Kumar Singh: Hockey
Bachan Lal Yadav: Wrestling
Munawar Anjar: Judo
DR. RP Singh: Hockey
Dharmendra Yadav: Boxing
Bhagat Singh: Wrestling
Vijay Pal Yadav: Wrestling
Rajesh Kumar Yadav: Sailing
Shweta Priyadarshini: Chess
Avinash Yadav: Sports
Alka Tomar: Female Wrestling
Punam Yadav: Weight lifting
Raj Kumar: Wrestling
Hakim Syed Zillur Rahman, Greek Medicine (Yunani medicine)
Buddhi Prakash: Yoga and Naturopathy
DR. CS Yadav: Medical
Dr. Rakesh Yadav: Medical
TP Trivedi: Astrology
Vinod Mehta: Journalism
Jasjit Singh Gill alias Jimmy Shergill: film acting
Nawazuddin Siddiqui: film acting
Girdhar Lal Mishra Ramanandacharya Jagadguru Swami Bhadracharya: philanthropy
Darshan Singh Yadav: philanthropy
Ramesh Bhaiya: philanthropy
Captain Yogendra Singh Yadav: Military service

2016
(Given in March, 2016)
Irfan Habib: education
Dr.Naresh Trehan: medicine
Prof. (Dr.) Ravi Kant: medicine
Ustaad Ghulam Mustafa Khan: vocal music
Ustaad Gulshan Bharti: vocal music
Surabhi Ranjan: vocal music
Sudhir Mishra: film direction
Vishal Bhardwaj: film direction
Anurag Kashyap: film direction
Ashok Chakradhar: literature
Arunima Sinha: mountaineering
Aparna Kumar: mountaineering
Dr. (Brig.) T. Prabhakar: medicine 
Sthavi Asthana: horse riding
Raju Srivastava: comedy
Hemant Sharma: journalism
R. P. Singh: Cricket
Anwar Jalalpuri:literature
Nahid Abidi: literature
Seema Punia: athletics
Jagbir Singh: hockey
Major AK Singh: rowing
Kamla Srivastava: folk music
Abhin Shyam Gupta: badminton
Sunil Jogi: literature
Gopal Chaturvedi: literature
Girja Shankar: literature
Sunil Kumar Rana: sports
Vijay Singh Chauhan: athletics
Anuj Chowdhary: sports
Nawaz Deobandi: education
Wazir Ahmad Khan: Chess
Chakesh Kumar Jain: art
Narendra Singh Rana: Powerlifting
Iqbal Ahmad Siddiqui: ghazal
Kum Kum Adarsh: Kathak
Lalji Yadav: wrestling
Imran Khan: poetry 
Ankit Tiwari: singing
Madhukar Trivedi: journalism
Sudha Singh: athletics
Dinesh Lal Yadav "Nirahua": acting
Manu Kumari Pal: athletics
Alim Ullah siddiqui: painting  
Servesh Yadav: shooting
Subhash Gupta: medicine

2016-17
(To given in October, 2016)
Rahul Kumar: Cricket
Jeetu sharma: Cricket
Umakant Tomar: Literature
Mohammad Imran Pratapgarhi: Urdu Poetry
Amir Shabbir : Editor
Ustaad gulfam: classical music
Sony Chaurasia: Kathak
Kashinath Yadav Birha
Aftab Sabri, Hashim Sabri: Qawwali
Mo. Aslam Warsi: Sufi singing
Gyanendra Pandey: Cricket
Bhuvneshwar Kumar: Cricket
Praveen Kumar: Cricket
Chawla: Cricket
Santosh Anand: Songwriter
Naseeruddin Shah: acting
Saurabh Shukla: Director
Anubhav Sinha: Director
Sumona Chakravarti : TV actress
Swaroop Kumar Kumar Bakshi: Literature
Anil Rastogi: Theatre personnel
Nawab Mir Jafar Abdullah: Sports
Suman Yadav: game
Mo. Bashir Badar: Literature
Venkat Changavli: philanthropy
Farooq Ahmed: philanthropy
Dr Sabiha Anwar: Education
Dr. Rakesh Kapoor: Medicine
Syed Mohd. Hssna: Greek Medical
Yogesh Mishra: Journalism
Kamar Rahman: Education & Science
Manoj Muntashir: lyricist
Begum Habibullah: Social Service
Pandit Vishwanath: Classical Music
DR. Ratish Agarwal Medical
Raj Krishna Mishra: Literature
Rajendra Singh: Water Harvesting
Manendra Kumar Mishra: Writing
Gen Anil Chait: Military service
Maheshwar Tiwari: Literature
Sarvesh Asthana: Literature
Oma The akk: Literature
Deepraj Rana: Film Direction
Ravi Kapoor: Photography
Dr. Deepak Agrawal Medical
DR. Ramratan Raina Medical
DR. Shivani Matnhelia: Classical Music
Ashok Nigam: Journalism
Arjun Bajpai: Hiking
Vijay Shekhar Sharma: Mobile Banking
Gargi Yadav: Wrestling
Ram Milan Yadav: Wrestling
Ramakant Yadav: Medical
Atam Prakash Mishra: Television
Gaur Das Chowdhury: Medical
Dhananjay Rai: Sports 
Noor Alassaba: Artist & Portraitist
Chakresh Kumar Jain: Handicraft
Archana Satish: Anchor
Shikha Dwivedi: Anchor
Varun Kumar: Paralympics

References

Civil awards and decorations of Uttar Pradesh